The Original Group 19 Rugby League was a competition which ran from the 1950 until 1970, in the Southern Tablelands region of New South Wales. Many clubs left for other competitions after this time, including  Group 16 and Group 8. The Group 19 tag was then transferred to Canberra and later Northern New South Wales.

History
A senior Rugby League competition under the enumeration Group 19 ran from the post-war years until 1970. Participating teams included Bibbenluke, Bombala, Delegate, Jindabyne and (usually) Adaminaby. In most seasons two or three Cooma teams participated – the Cooma Rovers and St Patricks, Cooma Blues or Cooma Citizens. Employees engaged in the Snowy River Scheme fielded teams for short periods – Public Service, Snowy and the intriguingly named Utah-Island Bend.

In 1971 the northern Group 19 clubs – Cooma Rovers, Adaminaby, Jindabyne, Cooma Citizens and Nimmitabel agreed to combine playing resources and field a team in the Group 16 competition, as the Alpine Wanderers. The three teams from southern Monaro, Bibbenluke, Bombala and Delegate, also joined the combined competition, although they remained separate clubs.

The enumeration Group 19 was later redeployed to the Canberra District competition, before again being used in the Northern Tablelands of New South Wales, with teams from Armidale, Glen Innes, Guyra, Narwan, Uralla and Walcha competing under that banner in the 1980s.

Former Teams

Grand Finals

References

Rugby league competitions in New South Wales
Sports leagues established in 1950
Sports leagues disestablished in 1970